Gbon is a town in northern Ivory Coast. It is a sub-prefecture and commune of Kouto Department in Bagoué Region, Savanes District.

In 2014, the population of the sub-prefecture of Gbon was 25,427.

Villages
The 9 villages of the sub-prefecture of Gbon and their population in 2014 are:
 Gbon (9 615)
 Dendrasso (1 134)
 Gbambiasso (693)
 Mahale (4 420)
 Nibrini (358)
 Ninioro (897)
 Pouniakele (2 016)
 Tounvre (4 150)
 Ziasso (2 144)

Notes

Sub-prefectures of Bagoué
Communes of Bagoué